Huagang is a station of Line 4, Suzhou Rail Transit. The station is located in the Wujiang District of Suzhou. It has been in use since April 15, 2017, the same time of the operation of Line 4.

References 

Suzhou Rail Transit stations
Railway stations in China opened in 2017